is a Japanese video game company based in Yokohama. It is notable for developing eroge video games with 3D graphics. Originally, its games were not allowed to be sold or used outside Japan, and official support was only given in Japanese and for use in Japan. However, with the release of Honey Select Unlimited in coordination with the online English erotic game storefront FAKKU, Illusion's policy has since changed. Prior to this change in policy, they were often translated and released in English and other languages by fans.

List of video games
Des Blood (December 26, 1997)
Des Blood 2 (June 11, 1998)
Bikō (May 14, 1999)
DANCINGCATs'Bikō 2: Reversible Face (January 2001)Requiem Hurts (June 29, 2001)Requiem Hurts: Chisame's Escape (Expansion, ??)Interact Play VR (August 21, 2001)Battle Raper (April 19, 2002)Des Blood 4: Lost Alone (September 13, 2002)Sexy Beach (December 2002)Des Blood VR (June 7, 2003)Sexy Beach 2 (July 11, 2003)Chiku Chiku Beach (Expansion, December 9, 2003)Bikō 3 (January 30, 2004)A-GA (June 25, 2004)Jinkō Shōjo ("Artificial Girl", July 23, 2004)Jinkō Shōjo 2 ("Artificial Girl 2", November 26, 2004)Battle Raper 2 (April 22, 2005)Oppai Slider 2 (November 25, 2005)RapeLay (April 21, 2006)Sexy Beach 3 (September 29, 2006)Sexy Beach 3 Plus (Expansion, December 15, 2006)SchoolMate (May 25, 2007)BotuPlay (Extra Disc, RapeLay, July 21, 2007)Jinkō Shōjo 3 ("Artificial Girl 3", November 30, 2007)Jinkō Shōjo 3 Privilege Disc (Bonus Disc, ? 2008)Jinkō Shōjo 3 Hannari (Expansion, June 2, 2008)Jinkō Shōjo 3 Hannari Privilege Disc (Expansion Bonus Disc, ? 2008)Hako (Box, October 10, 2008)SchoolMate Sweets! (Standalone Fan Disc, February 27, 2009)@Home Mate (May 29, 2009)Yuusha kara wa Nigerarenai! ("You can't escape from the heroine!", October 2, 2009)Real Kanojo ("Real Girlfriend", February 19, 2010)SchoolMate 2 (June 25, 2010)Sexy Beach Zero (October 29, 2010)Jinkō Gakuen ("Artificial Academy", June 10, 2011)Wakeari! (November 11, 2011)Love Girl (February 24, 2012)Ore ga Shujinkou ("I'm the Hero", May 25, 2012)Happy End Trigger (October 12, 2012)Premium Play Darkness (January 25, 2013)Premium Studio Pro (Disc Add-On Expansion, April 19, 2013)Musumakeup! (July 26, 2013)Immoral Ward (November 1, 2013)Real Play (March 7, 2014)Jinkō Gakuen 2 ("Artificial Academy 2", June 13, 2014)Jinkō Gakuen 2: Append Set (Add-on, August 29, 2014)Jinkō Gakuen 2: Append Set 2 (Add-on, October 31, 2014)HaremMate (December 26, 2014)Playclub (April 24, 2015)Playclub Studio (Disc Add-on Expansion, July 10, 2015)
 Sexy Beach Premium Resort (September 11, 2015)
 Sekurosufia ("Secrosphere", April 28, 2016)Honey Select ("Honey Select", September 9, 2016)Honey Select: Personality Addition Pack (Add-on, October 21, 2016)Honey Select: Party (Add-on Expansion, April 28, 2017)
 VR Kanojo (February 27, 2017, first attempt selling game in native English.)
 PlayHome (October 13, 2017)
 PlayHome Additional Data + Studio (Disc Add-on Expansion, January 26, 2018)
 Koikatsu (April 27, 2018)
 Koikatsu: Personality Addition Pack (Add-on, August 31, 2018)
 Koikatsu: After School (Add-on, December 21, 2018)
 Koikatsu: After Darkness (Add-on, May 31, 2019)
 Koikatsu Party (June 10, 2019, English release of Koikatu—character creation and studio only, all story and school mode content removed)
 Emotion Creators (Standalone Disc, April 26, 2019)
 AI Girl (Previously called Project-I) (October 25, 2019, Steam March 17, 2020)
 Honey Select 2 Libido (May 29, 2020)
 Honey Select 2 Libido DX (Add-on, October 30, 2020)Koikatsu Sunshine (August 27, 2021)Room Girl'' (September 30, 2022)

References

External links
Illusion Official Website 
Illusion Official Download Website 

Companies based in Yokohama
Hentai companies
Japanese companies established in 2001
Mass media in Yokohama
Video game companies established in 2001
Video game companies of Japan